The 2017 Israel State Cup Final decided the winner of the 2016–17 Israel State Cup, the 81st season of Israel's main football cup. It will be played on 25 May 2017 at the Teddy Stadium in Jerusalem, between Maccabi Tel Aviv and Bnei Yehuda Tel Aviv.

Maccabi Tel Aviv had previously played 35 Israel cup Finals, had won the competition a record 23 times. Their most recent appearance in the final was two years ago, in which they won 6–2 to Hapoel Beer Sheva at Sammy Ofer in Haifa. and their most recent appearance in the tournament the previous year's edition, in which they lost 1–0 to Maccabi Haifa.

Bnei Yehuda had previously played in 6 finals, winning 2. Their most recent final was in 2010, lost 3-1 to Hapoel Tel Aviv. Their most recent victory was in 1981, beating 4-3 in Penalties Hapeol Tel Aviv.

Maccabi Tel Aviv and Bnei Yehuda had played each other one time was in 1965, Maccabi Tel Aviv won 2-1.

The two teams played each other twice during the 2016–17 Israeli Premier League season. In the first instance, at Haberfeld Stadium on 27 November 2016 Bnei Yehuda won 1–0, Almog Buzaglo scoring. On 27 February 2017 at Netanya Stadium Maccabi Tel Aviv won 2–0, Barak Itzhaki and Viðar Örn Kjartansson scoring.

Road to the final

Details

Israel State Cup
State Cup
Cup 2017
Cup 2017
Israel State Cup matches
Israel State Cup Final 2017